The Lone Star Series (also known as the Silver Boot Series) is a Major League Baseball (MLB) rivalry featuring Texas' two major league franchises, the Houston Astros and Texas Rangers. It is an outgrowth of the "natural rivalry" established by MLB as part of interleague play as the Rangers are a member of the American League (AL) and the Astros were a member of the National League (NL) until . If each team had won three games each for a tie, the declared winner was the team that scored the most runs over the course of the series. In , the Astros joined the American League West with the Rangers and changed their rivalry from an interleague to an intradivision one with nineteen games played.

Background
The Greater Houston and Dallas–Fort Worth metroplex (DFW) areas have been rivals in sports and other areas for many years. Differences, not related to baseball, include the weather during the summer, population, cultural, and allegiance preferences between the different regions of Texas. Both Greater Houston and DFW have humid subtropical climates; however, DFW mostly has dry winds in the summer and sometimes icy conditions in the winter, with some frost at night, compared to Greater Houston's severe relative humidity and minimal wind, except near the coast, and milder winter conditions. The Metroplex is located inland in North Texas while Houston is in the face of the Gulf of Mexico in Southeast Texas. The city of Dallas has the 9th largest population in the United States and 3rd largest population in Texas; the city of Houston has the 4th largest population in the United States and largest population in Texas. DFW is the 4th largest metropolitan area in the US, while the Greater Houston area is the 5th largest in the US.

There is also contrast between the Rangers and Astros in their ballpark and uniform histories. The Rangers, until 2020, played in open-air stadiums (Arlington Stadium and Rangers Ballpark in Arlington), while the Astros have mostly played in indoor stadiums (Astrodome and Minute Maid Park). While the Rangers have traditionally worn variations of red, white, and blue to represent the Lone Star flag, the Astros have changed color schemes (e.g. Shooting Star of the late 1960s, Rainbow Guts) and logos many times throughout their history.

History

The Lone Star Series was the consequence of many things that happened to Texas in the 1950s: population shift westward from metropolitan areas on the East Coast, the space program, more modernized higher education, and the formation of the brief Continental League resulting in expansion in Major League Baseball shortly thereafter.

1962: Texas has its first major league team, the Colt .45s
Prior to 1962, there were no Major League Baseball teams in Texas until the Houston Colt .45's of the National League. They played in Colt Stadium for the first three years of existence, fighting against hot and humid weather and outrageously large mosquitoes, which also had an effect on the fans.  Unbelievably, they did not play a Sunday night baseball game at home until June 9, 1963, which was also the major leagues' first Sunday night game.  The Astros, as they came to be with the new all-weathered Harris County Domed Stadium, really did not have a strong rivalry with any team in the NL, except for the St. Louis Cardinals and later on the Cincinnati Reds and Atlanta Braves.

During the planning of the second wave of expansion in the big leagues in 1968, the National League considered putting a new team in the Dallas–Fort Worth area by an overwhelming majority of its owners. However, Judge Roy Hofheinz did not want it to happen or allow it because he owned all the television and radio rights in Texas for Astros ballgames. The other owners were in favor, except Hofheinz, of having a rivalry approaching the intensity of the Dodgers–Giants rivalry in the Senior Circuit. San Diego and Montreal were selected instead. The Dallas–Fort Worth area had to wait four more years for a team to arrive when the Senators (see below) moved to Arlington, Texas. It would be another 32 years before there was a meeting between the Rangers and Astros.

1972: Washington Senators move to Arlington to become the Rangers
Before they were the Texas Rangers, the team belonged to the Beltway as the second version of the Washington Senators where they played mediocre baseball most of the time for the first 11 years of existence. They replaced the old Washington Senators who had moved to the Minneapolis–Saint Paul area to become the Minnesota Twins in 1961. The new Senators changed into the Texas Rangers in time for the 1972 season, and so a rivalry was born. (At one time, the Kansas City Athletics were interested in moving to the Dallas/Fort Worth area in the early 1960s but were voted down, 9–1, by the other American League owners.) The Astros have been in Texas ten years longer than the Rangers, but the Senators/Rangers franchise is one year older than the Astros. They met, starting in 1992, at the end of spring training with the Rangers winning 2–0 and claiming the very first Silver Boot. On April 1, 1993, Nolan Ryan returned to the Astrodome as a member of the Texas Rangers in front of 53,657, the biggest crowd to see a big league game in Texas up to that point. The Rangers won the last two exhibition games, a 6–5 victory in Arlington in 1999 and a 9–3 victory at Houston in 2000, before the two teams met for the first time in regular season in 2001.

1996–2012: First official meetings and interleague play

One year before their first official matchup in interleague play, both teams retired the number of Hall of Famer Nolan Ryan, who had successful runs with both teams. During the 1997 off-season, "radical" realignment plans were bandied around about possibly rearranging teams from one league to another, especially Houston and Texas. In order to cut down on traveling costs and align teams together based on geography, the MLB owners came up with many plans to put the Astros and Rangers in a more suitable placement together. However, the American League and National League would lose their respective identities in the process. (The only move was the Brewers from the AL Central to the NL Central.) One of the plans in 2000 even featured the Texas Rangers in a six-team AL Central, so that they would be with other teams in the Central Time Zone, while the fledgling Arizona Diamondbacks would have had to leave the NL West for the AL West to replace the Rangers. During the 2005–06 off-season, the Florida Marlins were considering moving to San Antonio, among other cities, due to the lack of funding for a new stadium. Another professional baseball team in Texas, whether by relocation or expansion, in either league would create greater rivalries, similar to the kind in the NBA with the Spurs, Mavericks, and Rockets, and possible realignment issues.

The Lone Star Series was not conceived until , four years after interleague play began. It was only logical to have the Rangers and Astros matched together since they are the only MLB teams representing Texas. Since both played in two different divisions (AL West and NL Central, respectively), Major League Baseball had to rectify the oversight even though interleague play would not be rotated from division to division on a yearly basis until 2002.

There has only been one rainout in the history of the Lone Star Series. A game scheduled for Sunday June 30, 2002, at Rangers Ballpark in Arlington was postponed due to rain and rescheduled for Monday, September 2. The Rangers won the last game of the year against the Astros, 7–2, in front of a crowd of 24,468, but the Astros won the Silver Boot regardless of the outcome of the game.

On July 1, Rangers outfielder Gary Matthews Jr. stole a home run from Astro Mike Lamb (a former Ranger) in what was considered one of the greatest catches of the decade according to MLB Network. At that time according to Lamb and Mark Teixeira, the Rangers-Astros "rivalry" was more for the fans in Texas than like a bitter rivalry (e.g. Windy City Series).

Beginning in 2008, the Lone Star Series saw for the first time two African-American managers go head-to-head against one another, the Astros' Cecil Cooper and the Rangers' Ron Washington. This situation lasted for two years. On February 6, 2008, Nolan Ryan became the Rangers' team president after being the special assistant to general manager, scouting players, and holding pitching camps with the Astros for the previous three seasons.

On August 18, 2009, the Rangers acquired Iván Rodríguez in a trade from the Houston Astros to help them down the stretch for the purpose of achieving their first playoff appearance in ten years. It was Rodriguez's second stint with Texas. The team had a winning season but did not qualify for the postseason.

On September 14, 2010, the Astros' Triple-A affiliate, the Round Rock Express, announced that they would become the Rangers' new minor league affiliate. This change left the Astros without a Triple-A team and the  Rangers' old Triple-A team, the Oklahoma City RedHawks, without a parent club. On September 20, 2010, the Astros made the RedHawks their own affiliate. These changes went into effect for the 2011 season.

2013–present: Astros join the American League

Major League Baseball approved the sale of the Astros on November 11, to Jim Crane on the condition they join the American League West. The Rangers, located in the Central Time Zone, had many of their games start late in the Pacific Time Zone due to the Angels, Athletics, and Mariners all being located on the West Coast. The move's consequence for the rest of the league resulted in all teams having to play interleague games year round due to the odd number of teams in each league. Another consequence would be an increase in intensity of the Lone Star baseball rivalry.

The Astros and Rangers played each other on Opening Day on March 31, 2013, with the Astros winning convincingly at home. The next game, Rangers pitcher Yu Darvish was one out away from a perfect game when Marwin González hit a single through Darvish's legs.

On February 11, 2014, Nolan Ryan returned to the Astros as an executive advisor to his son, Reid, the president of business operations; general manager Jeff Luhnow; and owner Jim Crane. Nolan Ryan is also the only person to be named DHL Hometown Hero by two organizations (the Rangers and the Astros).

In April 2015, a brawl started between Rougned Odor and Hank Conger; the brawl escalated when Astros manager A. J. Hinch shoved Prince Fielder, which was followed by Rangers manager Jeff Bannister yelling in Hinch's face, "Don't touch my guy!" In September 2015, with both teams in contention for the playoffs, the Astros and Rangers faced each other in a pivotal series, with Texas sweeping all four games. The Rangers, who entered the series 1.5 games behind Houston for the AL West lead, ended the series leading the Astros by 2.5 games. The Rangers clinched the 2015 AL West Division title, while the Astros entered the 2015 playoffs as a Wild Card team. The Rangers marked the AL West division title by taunting the Astros with a parody of the Astros' "Come And Take It!" campaign by proclaiming "We Came And Took It!" during a game at Globe Life Park.
In 2017, the rivalry between the Astros and Rangers continued to heat up. During a radio interview Rangers manager Jeff Bannister was quoted as saying, "All I know is they get to put Houston on their chest. We get to put Texas on ours." Astros pitcher Lance McCullers Jr. fired back on Twitter stating, “It’s because nobody knows what Arlington is." Later in the 2017 season after Hurricane Harvey hit Houston, controversy arose when the Astros and Rangers could not negotiate swapping series forcing the Astros to play a series of home games against the Rangers at the Tampa Bay Rays' stadium (Tropicana Field) in Florida. The Rangers won the series 2–1 but lost the season series 7–12. The Astros swept the Rangers in the final three games of the series and outscored the Rangers 42–8 in the final four games. The Rangers did not make the 2017 playoffs, and the Astros clinched their first World Series championship, the first World Series Championship in the Astros-Rangers rivalry and the first World Series title for the State of Texas.

Houston was victorious in both the 2018 and 2019 Silver Boot Series as they won the AL West both seasons, making it three consecutive division titles for the club. Meanwhile, Texas continued to rebuild and had losing seasons for the second and third year in a row.

Notable players who played on both teams
A total of 77 players have played for both franchises. But out of those 77, only 3 have played their entire careers for both teams: Chuck Jackson, Mike Richardt, and Mike Simms. Only six players have played for both the Rangers and Astros against their in-state opponent since 2001. Those players are: Doug Brocail, Mike Lamb, Richard Hidalgo, Ivan "Pudge" Rodríguez, Hunter Pence, and Robinson Chirinos.
Nolan Ryan, Astros 1980–88, Rangers 1989–93
Ken Caminiti, Astros 1987–94, Astros 1999–2000, Rangers 2001
Iván Rodríguez, Rangers 1991–2002, Astros 2009, Rangers 2009
Darren Oliver, Rangers 1993–98, Rangers 2000–01, Astros 2004, Rangers 2010–11
Richard Hidalgo, Astros 1997–2004, Rangers 2005
Carl Everett, Astros 1998–99, Rangers 2002–03
CJ Nitkowski, Astros 1998, Rangers 2002–03
Jay Powell, Astros 1998–2001, Rangers 2002–04
Gregg Zaun, Rangers 1999, Astros 2002–03
Lance Berkman, Astros 1999–2010, Rangers 2013, Astros April 5, 2014 (One Day Retirement Contract)
Mike Lamb, Rangers 2000–03, Astros 2004-2007
Francisco Cordero, Rangers 2000–06, Astros 2012
Roy Oswalt, Astros 2001–10, Rangers 2012, Astros April 5, 2014 (One Day Retirement Contract)
Pedro Astacio, Astros 2001, Rangers 2005
Carlos Peña, Rangers 2001, Astros 2013, Rangers 2014
Dan Miceli, Rangers 2002, Astros 2003–04
Bruce Chen, Astros 2003, Rangers 2007
Doug Brocail, Rangers 2004–05, Astros 2008–09
Carlos Beltrán, Astros 2004, Rangers 2016, Astros 2017
Wandy Rodríguez, Astros 2005–12, Rangers 2015
Scott Feldman, Rangers 2005–12, Astros 2014–2016
Carlos Lee, Rangers 2006, Astros 2007–12
Armando Galarraga, Rangers 2007, Astros 2012
Carlos Corporán, Astros 2011–14, Rangers 2015
Anthony Bass, Astros 2014, Rangers 2015
Carlos Gómez, Astros 2015–16, Rangers 2016–17
Robinson Chirinos, Rangers 2013–18, Astros 2019, Rangers 2020
Hunter Pence, Astros 2007–11, Rangers 2019

Lone Star Series results

|-
| 
| Tie
| 3–3 
| Rangers, 2–1 
| Astros, 2–1
| Teams' first meetings as interleague rivals.  Rangers win tiebreaker by outscoring Astros 44–28
|-
| 
| style=";" | Astros
| style=";" | 4–2 
| Astros, 2–1
| Astros, 2–1
| 
|-
| 
| style=";" | Astros
| style=";" | 4–2 
| Rangers, 2–1
| Astros, 3–0
| 
|-
| 
| Tie
| 3–3 
| Astros, 2–1 
| Rangers, 2–1
| Rangers win tiebreaker by outscoring Astros 42–29
|-
| 
| style=";" | Rangers
| style=";" | 4–2 
| Astros, 2–1
| Rangers, 3–0
| Astros lose 2005 World Series.
|-
| 
| style=";" | Astros
| style=";" | 4–2 
| Astros, 2–1
| Astros, 2–1
| 
|-
| 
| style=";" | Rangers
| style=";" | 4–2 
| Rangers, 2–1
| Rangers, 2–1
| 
|-
|  
| Tie
| 3–3 
| Astros, 2–1 
| Rangers, 2–1 
| Rangers win tiebreaker by outscoring Astros 34–28
|-
| 
| style=";" | Rangers
| style=";" | 5–1 
| Rangers, 3–0
| Rangers, 2–1
| 

|-
| 
| style=";" | Rangers
| style=";" | 5–1 
| Rangers, 3–0
| Rangers, 2–1
| Rangers lose 2010 World Series
|-
| 
| style=";" | Rangers
| style=";" | 4–2 
| Rangers, 2–1
| Rangers, 2–1
| Rangers win eight straight meetings in Houston from 2009–11.  Rangers lose 2011 World Series.
|-
| 
| style=";" | Rangers
| style=";" | 5–1 
| Rangers, 2–1
| Rangers, 3–0
| 
|-
| 
| style=";" | Rangers
| style=";" | 17–2
| Rangers, 9–1
| Rangers, 8–1
| Astros move from NL Central to AL West, resulting in this becoming an intra-division rivalry, with the teams meeting 19 times per season.  
|-
| 
| style=";" | Astros
| style=";" | 11–8 
| Rangers, 5–4
| Astros, 7-3
| Rangers win 12 straight meetings (July 2013 – April 2014) and 10 straight meetings in Houston (April 2013 – May 2014).
|-
| 
| style=";" | Rangers
| style=";" | 13–6
| Rangers, 5–4
| Rangers, 8–2
| 
|-
| 
| style=";" | Rangers
| style=";" | 15–4
| Rangers, 7–2
| Rangers, 8–2
| Rangers win 12 straight home meetings (August 2015 – June 2016).
|-
| 
| style=";" | Astros
| style=";" | 12–7 
| Tie, 5–5 
| Astros, 7–2
| Astros win 2017 World Series
|-
|  
| style=";" | Astros
| style=";" | 12–7 
| Rangers, 6–3 
| Astros, 9–1
| 
|-
|  
| style=";" | Astros
| style=";" | 13–6 
| Astros, 9–0 
| Rangers, 6–4
| Astros win nine straight games in Arlington (March 2018 – April 2019). Astros win the AL Pennant and lose 2019 World Series.

|-
| 
|  Tie
|  5–5 
| Astros, 4–2
| Rangers, 3–1
| 10-game series in COVID-19-shortened season. Astros win tiebreaker by outscoring Rangers 42–37
|-
| 
| style=";" | Astros
| style=";" | 14–5 
| Astros, 9–0
| Tie, 5–5
| For second time in last three seasons, Astros win all home games versus Rangers; 
Astros win the AL Pennant and lose 2021 World Series
|-
| 
| style=";" | Astros
| style=";" | 14–5 
| Astros, 7–3
| Astros, 7–2
|Astros win the AL Pennant and the 2022 World Series
|-

|-
| Regular Season 
| style=";" | Rangers 
| style=";" | 130–123
|  Astros, 66–61
|  Rangers, 69–57
| Silver Boot Series (thru 2022) 
Astros 9, Rangers 9, Ties 4
|-

Rivalry trivia 
Former Astros and Rangers pitcher Nolan Ryan chose to have his Hall of Fame plaque depicted with a Rangers cap. He later played roles in both the Astros and Rangers front-office staff.
The Houston Astros played Game 3 of the 2005 World Series on October 25, 2005. It was the first World Series game played in the state of Texas.
The Texas Rangers won Game 3 of the 2010 World Series on October 30, 2010. It was the first World Series game won by a team from Texas. 
Former Astro Lance Berkman won a World Series Championship with the 2011 St. Louis Cardinals providing big moments in Game 6 against the Rangers. Berkman later played for the Rangers in 2013 but signed a one-day contract to officially retire as an Astro on April 5, 2014. 
The Astros defeated the Rangers on March 31, 2013, in their first game as a member of the AL West. 
Former Ranger Yu Darvish lost two games against the Astros as a member of the Los Angeles Dodgers in the 2017 World Series.
The Astros won the 2017 World Series over the Dodgers, becoming the first team from Texas to win a World Series (the Astros had previously lost the 2005 World Series, while the Rangers lost both of their appearances, in 2010 and 2011).
On June 15, 2022, the Astros had two different players pitch an immaculate inning against the same three Rangers batters. This is the only instance in MLB history of a team pitching two immaculate innings in the same game.

See also 
Governor's Cup (Texas) (NFL)
Texas Derby (MLS)
Houston–Rice rivalry
Texas–Texas A&M rivalry
Mavericks–Rockets rivalry
Major League Baseball rivalries

Sources

References

Houston Astros
Texas Rangers (baseball)
Baseball in Texas
Interleague play
Major League Baseball rivalries
2001 establishments in Texas